The Parliamentary Under-Secretary of State for Enterprise, Markets and Small Business is a junior position in the Department for Business, Energy and Industrial Strategy in the British government. It is currently held by Kevin Hollinrake.

The minister formerly worked at the Department for Business, Innovation and Skills.

List of ministers

References 

Department for Business, Energy and Industrial Strategy
Lists of government ministers of the United Kingdom